Nomad of Nowhere is an American 2D animated web series released on the website of Rooster Teeth on March 16, 2018. The show, which was created by Georden Whitman, is a western-fantasy hybrid focused on a mute wanderer hunted for being capable of using magic to give life to inanimate objects.

Premise
The series follows "the Nomad", a non-speaking scarecrow brought to life by magic, who can bring inanimate objects to life and wanders a Western fantasy realm ruled by the evil king El Rey while being pursued by bounty hunters and other enemies.

Characters

Main characters
  is the series namesake: a non-verbal scarecrow brought to life by magic. Although Red Manuel and Captain Toth describe him as harmful, he is kind and friendly. He can animate plants and objects, and even though Captain Toth says these are magic abilities, he does not show any abilities to use magic. His home, until the end of the show's first episode, is a thorn forest on the edge of a desert region.
  (voiced by Danu Uribe) leads a group of bounty hunters named the Dandy Lions and is under the command of the forceful Don Paragon. She may have feelings for Skout, her assistant.
  (voiced by Elizabeth Maxwell) is the assistant of Captain Toth who carries supplies and weapons. She is thoughtful and intelligent but doesn't often understand her strength or have strong self-confidence. Although it is not known why she is loyal to Captain Toth, she clearly has feelings for her. Later in the series, she becomes the only human being who assists The Nomad.
  (voiced by Alejandro Saab) is a self-absorbed member of Toth's unit, and is hostile toward her and Skout. He is below Toth in terms of commanding the unit but tries to compete for her position as the head of the unit.
  (voiced by Max Dennison) is the pompous superior officer of Red Manuel and Captain Toth, who fashions himself as the "ruler" of a land known as "the Oasis." He meets his end in the final episode of the first season when El Rey attacks him in the form of a murder of crows.
  (voiced by John Swasey) is the ruler of a neighboring region, Nowhere. He was reportedly corrupted through magic, leading all the users of magic to be drained of their power, while the Nomad somehow survived.

Supporting Characters

People of Bliss Hill

  (voiced by César Altagracia)
  (voiced by Barbara Dunkelman)
  (voiced by Adam Ellis)
  (voiced by Stephen Fu)
  (voiced by Caitlin Glass)
  (voiced by Chad James)
  (voiced by Richard Norman)
  (voiced by Brooke Olson)
  (voiced by Christine Stuckart)
  (voiced by Kyle Taylor)
  (voiced by Neal Werle)

Twindleweed Brothers Traveling Circus

  (voiced by Larry Matovina)
  (voiced by Matt Hullum), a strong woman with a beard
  (voiced by Ricco Fajardo), a tamer of lizards
  (voiced by Anna Hullum), a "trick shooter"

Other characters

  (voiced by Ian Sinclair)
  (voiced by Shannon McCormick)
  (voiced by Billy B. Burson)
  (voiced by Becca Frasier)
  (voiced by Blaine Gibson)
  (voiced by Jen Brown)
  (voiced by Lee Eddy)
  (voiced by Jordan Cwierz and Connor Pickens)
  (voiced by Melissa Sternenberg)
  (voiced by SungWon Cho)
  (voiced by Brittney Karbowski)
  (voiced by Yssa Badiola)
  (voiced by Daman Mills)
  (voiced by Jeb Kendrick)
  (voiced by Al McClelland and Kim Newman)
  (voiced by Josh Ornelas, César Altagracia and Luis Vazquez)
  (voiced by Jenn Tidwell and Stephanie Ard)
  (voiced by Alena Lecorchick)
  (voiced by Kyle Taylor)
  (voiced by Chris Kokkinos)
  (voiced by Kent Williams)
  (voiced by Todd Womack)

Episodes

Season 1

Promotion, production, and release
On January 17, 2018, Collider published an article about the show, describing it as a "western adventure that takes cues from Samurai Jack," quoting show director Jordan Cwiecz as describing it as a "western/fantasy mash-up about a mysterious nomad traversing a western wasteland that hasn’t seen magic in 100 years," saying that people should think of it "as two-parts Samurai Jack and True Grit with just a dash of The Lord of the Rings" with humor, fun, and much more. The series had been announced as part of the Rooster Teeth animation slate, along with gen:Lock, RWBY volume 6, Red vs. Blue, Camp Camp, RWBY Chibi, and others, the same day.

In February, RoosterTeeth released a promotional video for the series. Another teaser was posted in early March.

Season 1 of Nomad of Nowhere began airing on March 16 for FIRST members, and March 23 for everyone else.

In April 2017, Jordan wrote a post announcing the mid-season break of the show and noted that the first season would have a total of 12 episodes. The first season aired its last episode on September 28, 2018.

In late March 2018, show director Jordan was interviewed by Collider, calling the series a slapdash of "a bunch of spaghetti westerns got mashed up with all your favorite fantasy series to create one epic adventure," saying the idea of the show came from Georden Whitman, a production artist for a show named Camp Camp, and was inspired by his college animation, Sir Knight of Nothing. He also said that his main source of inspiration came from live-action drama like spaghetti westerns and Deadwood, which have nostalgia and themes of despair in harsh lands with hard lives. Jordan also described the show as ambitious, challenging, and unique, allowing for an exploration of animation styles, inspired by Disney art books, Studio Ghibli, and more, calling it a show that "has the ingredients of things like Samurai Jack and Trigun while still having the legs to stand on its own pretty much sums up what we strive to do."

In May 2022, it was announced that FilmRise has acquired streaming rights for Nomad of Nowhere, Camp Camp, and Red vs. Blue, grouping episodes from each series into "traditional half-hour formats and seasons for streaming."

Apart from airing on Rooster Teeth and the Rooster Teeth animation YouTube channel, the series is on Tubi, and other platforms, such as iTunes, and Prime Video as a movie.

LGBTQ representation
The series protagonist, Skout, is a lesbian character who has a crush on her superior, Captain Toth. Often trying to inspire confidence in her superior, Skout is often the voice of reason for Toth, who is  rule-oriented and may have feelings for Skout, despite the fact she is occasionally dismissive, causing fissures in their relationship. As series creator Georden Whitman described it, the narrative growth of Skout and Toth was his favorite part of the story;

Reception
Reviews of this series were relatively positive. In his first review of the series, Dave Trumbore of Collider called the show excellent, saying that whilst it has a Western plot, it has "more of a fun, playful feel," especially when it comes to the Nomad. In a later review, he called the series a story which brings together the Wild West, cartoonish magic, and classic 20th century cartoons, serving as a magical and adventure tale which features a "very silly collection of characters" who encounter the nomad, stating that it is "just a bit different from the rest" of the cartoons out there. Padraig Cotter of Screen Rant described the show as a "mixture of fantasy and western" with a "quirky sense of humor and blend of genres," saying it has earned a loyal fanbase, and even said that some compared it to Trigun and Samurai Jack. Tommy Williams of Geek Tyrant described the series as "very family friendly" and "lighthearted fun". Other reviewers pointed to Western genre themes, and praised Rooster Teeth for branching "into new avenues," citing the show as one example of this.

Future
Although the Season 1 finale, teased that the show would continue into a second season, series creator Georden Whitman, who left RT before Season 1 ended, publicly criticized RoosterTeeth, citing "creative differences" as a reason and saying he gave the show's writers "the outline of the whole story, including the ending." Responding to claims that RoosterTeeth engages in "heavy crunch periods," resists providing benefits, has work weeks which are eighty hours, and other issues, he agreed that these claims were correct.

On July 11, 2020, on an episode of the podcast Talk CRWBY to Me, Miles Luna revealed writer Kiersi Burkhart originally joined Rooster Teeth to work on Season 2 of Nomad of Nowhere and the process went "pretty far along," but production was halted when it was decided continuing the series at the time was not advisable. In a September 2020 Tumblr post, RT Animation director Jordan Cwierz explained Rooster Teeth does not cancel shows it owns, but under the company's restructuring, shows like Camp Camp now fall under the RT Studios label, meaning they are no longer produced on their own and are being shopped to partners. Cwierz added that the same applies to shows like Nomad of Nowhere, although his only comment was that they were "trying to make" more episodes.

See also

 Rooster Teeth
 List of animated series with LGBT characters: 2015-2019
 History of animation

References

External links

Episodes 2-12 on RoosterTeeth YouTube page

Reviews of Nomad of Nowhere episodes on BubbleBlabber

2018 web series debuts
2018 web series endings
2010s YouTube series
American adult animated adventure television series
American adult animated fantasy television series
American adult animated science fiction television series
American animated science fantasy television series
2010s American adult animated television series
2010s American LGBT-related animated television series
Western (genre) animated television series
Fantasy web series
American animated web series
Hispanic and Latino American television